Michael James Evans  (born June 2, 1967) is a former American football defensive end for the Kansas City Chiefs of the National Football League (NFL). He played college football at the University of Michigan.

Early years
Evans attended Cushing Academy and played high school football as a linebacker. He spent a year at a prep school to improve his grades. 

He walked-on at the University of Michigan, before receiving a scholarship. He was converted from an inside linebacker into a defensive tackle as a freshman. He became a starter as a sophomore. In his junior season he posted 46 tackles (third on the team) and 7 sacks (led the team). In his last year he received All-Big Ten honors.

Professional career

Kansas City Chiefs
Evans was selected by the Kansas City Chiefs in the fourth round (101st overall) of the 1992 NFL Draft. As a rookie, he appeared in 12 games (one start), registering 5 tackles and 4 quarterback pressures. He was waived on August 24, 1993.

Green Bay Packers
On March 2, 1994, he was signed as a free agent by the Green Bay Packers. He was released on August 23.

References

External links
Eye of the Storm

1967 births
Living people
People from Saint Croix, U.S. Virgin Islands
United States Virgin Islands players of American football
American football defensive tackles
Michigan Wolverines football players
Kansas City Chiefs players